The Miami RedHawks men's basketball team — known as the Miami Redskins until 1997 — is the intercollegiate men's basketball program representing Miami University. The school competes in the Mid-American Conference (MAC) in Division I of the National Collegiate Athletic Association (NCAA). The RedHawks play home basketball games at Millett Hall in Oxford, Ohio on the university campus. Miami has reached the NCAA Championship's Sweet Sixteen four times and has been the MAC regular season champions 20 times. The RedHawks have appeared in the NCAA Tournament 17 times, most recently in 2007. The team is currently coached by Travis Steele.

In May 2013, the Ohio Basketball Hall of Fame inducted 11 players and coaches who starred in the state including Miami's Wayne Embry, Randy Ayers, Ron Harper and Wally Szczerbiak.

Postseason

NCAA tournament results
The RedHawks have appeared in the NCAA Tournament 17 times. Their combined record is 6–19.

NIT results
The RedHawks have appeared in the National Invitation Tournament (NIT) six times. Their combined record is 2–6.

CBI results
The RedHawks have appeared in the College Basketball Invitational (CBI) three times. Their combined record is 0–3.

Retired numbers

Redhawks in the NBA
Miami University has had 8 former players who have gone on to play in the NBA.

References

External links